|}

The Middle Park Stakes is a Group 1 flat horse race in Great Britain open to two-year-old colts. It is run on the Rowley Mile at Newmarket over a distance of 6 furlongs (1,207 metres), and it is scheduled to take place each year in September.

History
The event was founded by William Blenkiron, and it is named after his stud at Eltham. It was established in 1866, and was initially titled the Middle Park Plate. It was originally open to horses of either gender.

The race was formerly staged during Newmarket's Cambridgeshire Meeting in late September or early October. It was restricted to colts in 1987. It became part of a new fixture called Future Champions Day in 2011.

From 2015, the Middle Park Stakes was moved from Future Champions Day and brought forward two weeks, returning to the Cambridgeshire meeting, to avoid a clash with the similar Dewhurst Stakes.

The Middle Park Stakes was added to the Breeders' Cup Challenge series in 2012. The winner earned an automatic invitation to compete in the Breeders' Cup Juvenile Sprint. The Middle Park Stakes was dropped from the Challenge series when the Juvenile Sprint Stakes was discontinued after the 2012 running.

The leading horses from the Middle Park Stakes sometimes go on to compete in the following season's 2000 Guineas. The first to win both was Prince Charlie (1871–72), and the most recent was Rodrigo de Triano (1991–92).

Records
Leading jockey (6 wins):
 Danny Maher – Minstead (1901), Flotsam (1902), Lesbia (1907), Bayardo (1908), Lemberg (1909), Corcyra (1913)
 Sir Gordon Richards – Medieval Knight (1933), Scottish Union (1937), Khaled (1945), The Cobbler (1947), Abernant (1948), Royal Challenger (1953)
 Lester Piggott – Petingo (1967), Steel Heart (1974), Junius (1978), Mattaboy (1980), Cajun (1981), Diesis (1982)

Leading trainer (7 wins):
 Aidan O'Brien – Minardi (2000), Johannesburg (2001), Ad Valorem (2004), Crusade (2011), US Navy Flag (2017), Ten Sovereigns (2018), Blackbeard (2022)

Leading owner (7 wins) (includes part ownership):
 Susan Magnier - Minardi (2000), Johannesburg (2001), Ad Valorem (2004), Crusade (2011), US Navy Flag (2017), Ten Sovereigns (2018), Blackbeard (2022)

Winners

See also
 Horse racing in Great Britain
 List of British flat horse races
 Recurring sporting events established in 1866 – this race is included under its original title, Middle Park Plate.

References

 Paris-Turf: 
 Racing Post:

 galopp-sieger.de – Middle Park Stakes (ex Middle Park Plate).
 ifhaonline.org – International Federation of Horseracing Authorities – Middle Park Stakes (2019).
 pedigreequery.com – Middle Park Stakes – Newmarket.
 

Flat races in Great Britain
Newmarket Racecourse
Flat horse races for two-year-olds
Recurring sporting events established in 1866
1866 establishments in England